Elections were held in the Australian state of Queensland between 30 May 1863 and 27 June 1863 to elect the members of the state's Legislative Assembly.

Key dates
Due to problems of distance and communications, the elections could not be held on a single day.

See also
 Members of the Queensland Legislative Assembly, 1863–1867

References

Elections in Queensland
1863 elections in Australia
1860s in Queensland
May 1863 events
June 1863 events